Léo Duguay (born 13 March 1944) is a Canadian politician, educator and school administrator prior to getting elected. Duguay served as a Progressive Conservative party member of the House of Commons of Canada.

Duguay was born in Saint Boniface, Manitoba. Duguay was elected at the riding of Saint Boniface in the 1984 federal election and served in the 33rd Canadian Parliament. He left federal politics after the 1988 federal election after being defeated by Ron Duhamel of the Liberal party.

Archives 
There is a Léo Duguay fonds at Library and Archives Canada. Archival reference number is R10108.

Electoral history

External links
 

1944 births
Living people
Members of the House of Commons of Canada from Manitoba
People from Saint Boniface, Winnipeg
Politicians from Winnipeg
Progressive Conservative Party of Canada MPs